Pader District is a district in Northern Uganda. It is named after Pader, the chief municipal, administrative and commercial town in the district, where the district headquarters are located.

Location
Pader District is bordered by Lamwo District to the northwest, Kitgum District to the northeast, Agago District to the east, Lotuke District to the southeast, Lira District to the south, Oyam District to the southwest and Gulu District to the west. The coordinates of the district are:02 50N, 33 05E.

Overview
The district is relatively new, having been part of Kitgum District in the past. In December 2001, Aruu County and Agago County were carved out of Kitgum District to form Pader District. The seat of the district government, Pader, is located in the center of the district. The district, along with Amuru District, Agago District, Gulu District, Lamwo District, Nwoya District and Kitgum District, constitutes Acholi sub-region, considered to be the historical homeland of the Acholi ethnic group, and home to an estimated 1.1 million inhabitants in 2002, according to the national census conducted that year.

Population
In 1991, the national population census estimated the district population at about 80,900. The 2002 national census estimated the population of the district at about 142,300. For the greater part of the first decade of the 2000s, the majority of the population within the district have been living in camps for internally displaced people (IDP), as the result of the Lord's Resistance War. With the cessation of hostilities between  the LRA and the UPDF in 2006, the majority of the people in the IDP camps have moved back to their homes. In 2012, the population of Pader District was estimated at approximately 231,700.

Economic activity
Agriculture is the backbone of the district economy. 90% of the district population engage in agriculture. The food crops grown include The following:

Cash crops include: Cotton, Groundnuts, Sunflower, Rice, Tobacco, Soya beans and Simsim. Fish farming and fish hunting are also commonly practiced.

See also

References

External links
Pader District Information Portal

 
Acholi sub-region
Districts of Uganda
Northern Region, Uganda